Evgeny Donskoy was the defending champion but chose not to defend his title.

Alex Bolt won the title after defeating Hubert Hurkacz 5–7, 7–6(7–4), 6–2 in the final.

Seeds

Draw

Finals

Top half

Bottom half

References
Main Draw
Qualifying Draw

Zhuhai Open - Men's Singles
2018 Men's Singles